Judge Stone may refer to:

Abby Stone, fictional judge on the TV series Night Court
Andrew H. Stone (fl. 1980s–2020s), judge of the Third Judicial District Court of Utah
Earl S. Stone (fl. 1840s), namesake of the Judge Earl S. Stone House in Indiana
Harry Stone, fictional judge on the TV series Night Court
Kimbrough Stone (1875–1958), judge of the United States Court of Appeals for the Eighth Circuit
Margaret Stone (judge) (died 2021), judge of the Federal Court of Australia.
Patrick Thomas Stone (1889–1963), judge of the United States District Court for the Western District of Wisconsin
William M. Stone (1827–1893), judge of the Iowa state district court

See also
Justice Stone (disambiguation)